Kusin (German: Küssin) is a village in Poland. Kusin may also refer to
Kusín, a village and municipality in Slovakia
Igor Kusin (born 1963), Yugoslav linguist and author

See also
Kuzin
Kusin Ch'utu, a mountain in Bolivia